Beautiful is the third studio album by Australian recording artist Jessica Mauboy, released on 4 October 2013 by Sony Music Australia. The album was recorded at several recording studios in Hollywood, Los Angeles and Sydney. Mauboy worked on Beautiful with a variety of producers and songwriters, including DNA, The Fliptones, Brian Kennedy, Harvey Mason, Jr., Adam Reily and The Underdogs. She co-wrote ten of the thirteen songs on the album's standard edition. The album explored a mixture of dance-oriented tracks with R&B and pop.

Upon its release, Beautiful received positive reviews from critics, who praised its catchy production and honest lyrics. The album debuted at number three on the ARIA Albums Chart and became Mauboy's highest-charting album. It was certified platinum by the Australian Recording Industry Association for shipments of more than 70,000 copies. Beautiful earned Mauboy two nominations at the 2014 ARIA Music Awards for Album of the Year and Best Female Artist. Mauboy promoted the album with television performances and instore appearances. She also embarked on her second headlining concert tour, entitled the To the End of the Earth Tour.

Beautiful produced five singles, including the top-ten hits "Pop a Bottle (Fill Me Up)" and "Never Be the Same", which were both certified platinum for sales exceeding 70,000 copies. The album was re-released as a platinum edition on 21 November 2014 and features five additional songs, including the fifth single "Can I Get a Moment?", which became Mauboy's eighth top-ten hit.

Background and development
In an interview with Spotlight Report, Mauboy admitted that after her work on the 2012 musical film The Sapphires and its soundtrack which features 1960s soul music, she struggled to find a direction for her third studio album. "This album was definitely quite frustrating and hard to put together ... It was a hard process after coming off the back of doing The Sapphires and having that beautiful soul, motown classic music. It really kind of left me not knowing what I wanted to do next because that [The Sapphires] was so good." Mauboy further stated that not knowing which direction she wanted to go with helped. "I had all these stories and feelings. All I needed was to be in the studio and play a bit of piano and play some melodies to help me write."

Mauboy told The Northern Star that Beautiful is "very diverse ... I'm taking it back to my first album where I had a bit of dance and twist of R&B." Part of the album's musical direction was influenced by 1990s music, including dance artists such as Culture Beat and Corona. "I'm such a big '90s fan and grew up with the '90s, and I love how artists had such big vocals and yet such simple bedding on the tracks – and they use such little effects." Mauboy wrote half of Beautiful in Australia with DNA and Adam Reily, and also in Los Angeles. She co-wrote ten of the thirteen songs on the album's standard edition. Harvey Mason, Jr. served as the creative director for Beautiful and co-wrote and produced a number of songs.

Release and promotion
Mauboy's exclusive interview with Melissa Doyle in Darwin was broadcast on Sunday Night on 15 September 2013. On 26 September 2013, she co-hosted The Footy Show and performed a medley of "Inescapable", "To the End of the Earth" and "Saturday Night". On 29 September 2013, Beautiful became available to stream online via Songl.com before its official release. Mauboy performed "Pop a Bottle (Fill Me Up)" during the fifth season of The X Factor Australia on 30 September 2013. The album was released both digitally and physically on 4 October 2013. The following day, Mauboy performed and signed copies of Beautiful at Tumbalong Park, Darling Harbour in Sydney. On 6 October 2013, she performed at the 2013 NRL Grand Final. Mauboy performed songs from Beautiful and signed copies of the album during instore appearances at Westfield Kotara on 7 October 2013 and Westfield Fountain Gate on 10 October 2013. She performed "Pop a Bottle (Fill Me Up)" at the 2013 ARIA Music Awards on 1 December 2013.

The platinum edition of Beautiful was released on 21 November 2014 and features five bonus tracks, including the album's fifth single "Can I Get a Moment?". Mauboy performed the song during the grand final live decider show of the sixth season of The X Factor Australia (20 October 2014), on Sunrise (22 October 2014), and at the 2014 ARIA Music Awards (26 November 2014). She also performed and signed copies of the platinum edition during instore appearances at Westpoint Blacktown (23 November 2014), Castle Towers (30 November 2014), Watergardens Town Centre (7 December 2014) and Westfield Parramatta (13 December 2014).

Singles
"To the End of the Earth" was released as the lead single from Beautiful on 17 July 2013. It peaked at number 21 on the ARIA Singles Chart and was certified gold by the Australian Recording Industry Association for sales exceeding 35,000 copies. The second single "Pop a Bottle (Fill Me Up)", released on 27 September 2013, debuted at number two and was certified platinum for selling over 70,000 copies. The album's title track "Beautiful" was released as the third single on 22 November 2013, and became Mauboy's lowest charting single at number 46. The fourth single "Never Be the Same", released on 7 March 2014, peaked at number six and was certified platinum. "Can I Get a Moment?" was released as the fifth single from Beautiful on 17 October 2014. It debuted at number five and was certified platinum. "The Day Before I Met You" was released as the sixth single on 13 February 2015, and debuted at number 41.

To the End of the Earth Tour

In July 2013, Mauboy announced the To the End of the Earth Tour, a national tour presented by Nescafé to celebrate its global 75th anniversary. Tickets for the tour went on sale on 5 August. There were 27 shows in metropolitan and regional Australia that ran from November 2013 to January 2014.

Reception

Tim Spencer of Q News viewed Beautiful as the type of album "you can easily wind down and dance to", and concluded that fans of Mauboy's previous efforts "will definitely be impressed with this record." Renowned for Sound's Jana Angeles praised the album's "perfect balance" of pop and R&B, and further added, "what makes Beautiful such an impressive album by Mauboy is the fact that some of the tracks have honest lyrics and are clearly spoken from the heart." Suzie Keen of In Daily wrote the album is "a no-brainer for fans of pure pop" and found the tracks to be "irresistibly catchy." Entertainment Hive's Honey B called it "a stunningly honest CD with beautiful melodies." Beautiful was nominated for "World's Best Album" at the 2014 World Music Awards, and earned Mauboy two nominations at the 2014 ARIA Music Awards for Album of the Year and Best Female Artist.

Commercial performance
Beautiful debuted at number three on the ARIA Albums Chart issue dated 13 October 2013; it became Mauboy's third top-ten album and the highest-charting album of her career. Due to the success of the album's fourth single "Never Be the Same", Beautiful jumped from number 42 to number 17 for the issue dated 21 April 2014. The following week, Beautiful moved up to number four, making it a fourth week within the top ten for the album. Following the release of the platinum edition in November 2014, Beautiful was certified platinum by the Australian Recording Industry Association for shipments of 70,000 copies.

Track listing

Notes
  signifies an additional producer
  signifies a vocal producer
  signifies a co-producer

Credits
Adapted from album liner.

Recording locations
Adz Joint in Sydney
Brandon's Way Recording Studios in Los Angeles
Captain Cuts Studios in Los Angeles
The Highlands in Hollywood
Mason Sound in North Hollywood
New Holland Studios in Sydney
Orange Factory Studios in Los Angeles
Rondor/Universal Recording Studio
Sony Studios in Sydney

Mastering locations
Sterling Sound in New York City
Studios 301 in Sydney

Personnel

 Vocal credits
Alex Hope – backing vocals
Jessica Mauboy – lead vocals
Pitbull – featured artist
Louis Schoorl – backing vocals

 Creative credits
Liz Ham – photography
Rachel Kara – photography
Harvey Mason, Jr. – creative director
Darren McDonald – photography
Eoin Stanley – artwork design
Sony DADC – artwork design

Technical credits

Gino Barletta – songwriter, vocal producer, engineering
Ben Berger (Captain Cuts) – songwriter, producer, engineering
Bekuh BOOM – vocal producer, engineering
Paul Boutin – recording, mixing
Trina Bowman – production coordination
David Boyd – recording, recording assistant
Rikard Brandén – guitars, additional programming
Adrian Breakspear – additional engineering 
Britt Burton – songwriter
Miguel Costa – horns
Tom Coyne – mastering
Helen Jane Culver – songwriter
Mike Daley – songwriter, co-producer, recording assistant
David Delazyn (The Fliptones) – songwriter
Antonio Dixon – songwriter, producer
Kenneth "Babyface" Edmonds – songwriter, producer
Anthony Egizii (DNA) – songwriter, producer, mixing, programming and keys
Randy Ellis – horns
Mike Fletcher – saxophone
Nikki Flores – songwriter
Andrew Hey – songwriter, guitars, recording
Charles Hinshaw – songwriter, producer, programming and keys
Alex Hope – songwriter, guitar
Eric Jackson – guitars
Ross James Irwin – songwriter
Rebecca Johnson – songwriter
Dante Jones – songwriter, co-producer
Brian Kennedy – songwriter, producer
Al-Sherrod "A-Rod" Lambert – songwriter
Mario Marchetti – songwriter, producer, vocal producer

Harvey Mason, Jr. (The Underdogs) – songwriter, producer, additional producer, mixing
Jessica Mauboy – songwriter
Mitchell McCarthy – mixing
Ryan McMahon (Captain Cuts) – songwriter, producer, engineering
Jaden Michaels – songwriter
Chaz Mishan (The Fliptones) – songwriter, producer, programming and keys
Raymond Monteiro – horns
David Musumeci (DNA) – songwriter, producer, guitars
Samantha Nathan – songwriter
Armando Perez (Pitbull) – songwriter
Jonathan Perkins (Jonny Perkins) – songwriter, producer, programming and keys, engineering
Sean Phelan – mixing
Carmen Reece – songwriter
Adam Reily – songwriter, producer, vocal producer, programming and keys
Khristopher Riddick-Tynes (The Rascals) – songwriter, producer
James Royo – mixing
Stuart Schenk – engineering
Louis Schoorl – songwriter, producer, recording, mixing, keyboards, guitar, programming
Jeremy Skaller (J Remy) - songwriter, producer
Garrett Smith – horns
J Que Smith – songwriter
Damon Thomas (The Underdogs) – songwriter, producer
Leon Thomas III (The Rascals) – songwriter, producer
Cristi Vaughn – songwriter
Miles Walker – mixing
Par Westerlund (Paro) – songwriter, producer, instruments and programming
Leon Zervos – mastering

Charts

Weekly charts

Year-end charts

Certifications

Release history

References

2013 albums
Jessica Mauboy albums
Sony Music Australia albums
Albums produced by Babyface (musician)
Albums produced by Brian Kennedy (record producer)
Albums produced by DNA Songs
Albums produced by Harvey Mason Jr.
Albums produced by the Underdogs (production team)